Etincelles Football Club is an association football club based in Gisenyi, Rwanda. They currently compete in the Rwanda National Football League and play their home games at the 5,000-capacity Umuganda Stadium.

Achievements
Rwandan Cup: 1
 1988

Performance in CAF competitions

References

Football clubs in Rwanda